Cherry Ridge Airport  is a privately owned, public use airport located three nautical miles (6 km) south of the central business district of Honesdale, a borough in Wayne County, Pennsylvania, United States. This airport was included in the National Plan of Integrated Airport Systems for 2009–2013, which categorized it as a general aviation facility.

Facilities and aircraft 
Cherry Ridge Airport covers an area of 90 acres (36 ha) at an elevation of 1,357 feet (414 m) above mean sea level. It has one runway designated 18/36 with an asphalt surface measuring 2,986 by 50 feet (910 x 15 m).

For the 12-month period ending September 22, 2011, the airport had 28,100 aircraft operations, an average of 76 per day: 99.6% general aviation and 0.4% air taxi. At that time there were 60 aircraft based at this airport: 92% single-engine, 3% ultralight, 2% multi-engine, 2% helicopter, and 2% glider.

References

External links 
 Cherry Ridge Airport Website
 Cherry Ridge Airport Restaurant
 Cherry Ridge Airport (N30) at Pennsylvania DOT Bureau of Aviation
 Aerial image as of April 1999 from USGS The National Map
 

Airports in Pennsylvania
Transportation buildings and structures in Wayne County, Pennsylvania